K.M.O English Medium High School, Koduvally is one of the several establishments under the Koduvally Muslim Orphanage. The school was established in 1990.

References

Schools in Kozhikode
Educational institutions established in 1990
1990 establishments in Kerala
High schools and secondary schools in Kerala